Probably Racist is the fourth studio album by Israeli-American parody rapper Rucka Rucka Ali. The album was released July 26, 2011, and distributed by Pinegrove Records. It peaked at number 11 on the Billboard Top Comedy Albums.

Background 
Rucka Rucka Ali took the name of the album from a June 2010 incident where three British students were reprimanded after publicly showing the music video for his single "Ima Korean" to their class while studying different countries' musical traditions. One South Korean student was "devastated, upset, very offended, and feeling very lonely" as the only East-Asian child in the class. An assistant headteacher named Len Idle said the song was "probably racist".

Similarly to Rucka Rucka Ali's previous album, I'm Black, You're White & These Are Clearly Parodies, this album contains a mix of parody and non-parody songs; this is unlike his first album, Straight Outta West B, which contains only original songs.

Track listing

Charts

References 

2011 albums
Rucka Rucka Ali albums